Gregory Chioniades (c. 1240 – c. 1320) was a Byzantine Greek astronomer. He traveled to Persia, where he learned Persian mathematical and astronomical science, which he introduced into Byzantium upon his return from Persia and founded an astronomical academy at Trebizond. Choniades also served as Orthodox bishop in Tabriz.

Biography
Information about Chioniades survives from some contemporary sources. In 1347, George Chrysokokkes wrote that 

He was born in Constantinople, probably around 1240, and was originally named George. Sixteen of Chioniades' letters have survived, which confirm that he received assistance from Alexios II and traveled to Persia. Chioniades translated a number of Arabic and Persian works on mathematics and astronomy, including the astronomical tables of his teacher Shams al-Din al-Bukhari, who had worked at the famous Maragheh observatory under the polymath Nasir al-Din al-Tusi. Chioniades played an important role in transmitting several innovations from the Islamic world to Europe. These include the introduction of the universal latitude-independent astrolabe to Europe and a Greek description of the Tusi couple, which would later have an influence on Copernican heliocentrism. Chioniades also translated several Zij treatises into Greek, including the Persian Zij-i Ilkhani by al-Tusi and the Maragheh observatory as well as the Seljuk Sanjaric Tables by al-Khazini, an Islamic astronomer of Byzantine Greek descent. 

Chioniades resided in Tabriz, at the time the Mongol capital, from 1295 to 1296, serving as the Orthodox bishop to the Orthodox community in that city, and later returned to Constantinople. In 1302 he returned to Tabriz as bishop. According to David Pingree, this may have been in connection with Andronikos II Palaiologos's attempt to form an alliance with Ghazan Khan in the summer of 1302.

He stayed at Tabriz at least until 1310, before returning to Trebizond, where he is attested as a hieromonk around 1315. Chioniades also wrote religious works, including a commentary on John of Damascus, a liturgy  on St. Eugenios of Trebizond, and a profrssion of faith.

Notes

Sources
 Fryde, Edmund Boleslaw "The Early Palaeologan Renaissance 1261 - C. 1360" 2000
 
 
 
 
 
 

People from Constantinople
13th-century Byzantine monks
14th-century Byzantine monks
Byzantine astronomers
13th-century Eastern Orthodox bishops
14th-century Eastern Orthodox bishops
1240s births
1320s deaths
Year of birth uncertain
Year of death uncertain
13th-century Byzantine scientists
14th-century Byzantine scientists
13th-century Byzantine writers
14th-century Byzantine writers
People of the Empire of Trebizond
History of Tabriz
People of the Ilkhanate
Translators to Greek
14th-century Greek writers
14th-century Greek philosophers
14th-century Greek educators
14th-century Greek scientists
13th-century Greek writers
13th-century Greek philosophers
13th-century Greek educators
13th-century Greek scientists
13th-century Greek mathematicians
14th-century Greek mathematicians